The 1972 South Australian Championships was a  combined men's and women's Grand Prix tennis tournament held in Adelaide, Australia and played on outdoor grass courts. The tournament was held from 17 January through 23 January 1972. Alex Metreveli and Evonne Goolagong won the singles titles.

Finals

Men's singles

 Alex Metreveli defeated  Kim Warwick 6–3, 6–3, 7–6.
 It was Metreveli's 3rd title of the year, and the 5th of his career.

Women's singles
 Evonne Goolagong defeated  Olga Morozova 7–6, 6–3

References

External links
 

 
South Australian Tennis Championships
South Australian Tennis Championships, 1972
South Australian Tennis Championships
South Australian Tennis Championships